Just Another Love Story is a romance-drama web series, directed and edited by Priyanka Karki in her directorial debut. The series stars Priyanka Karki, Shristi Shrestha, and Samyek Man Singh in the lead roles.

Plot 
The plot features a love triangle between two women, Amara and Maya, respectively (Priyanka Karki, Shristi Shrestha) and a straight man, Aashu (Samyek Man Singh).

Episodes

Cast 

 Priyanka Karki as Amara
 Shristi Shrestha as Maya
 Samyek Man Singh as Aashu

Production 
On 1 July 2019 Priyanka Karki unveiled three first-look posters of the series via online photo-sharing platform Instagram. Karki chose Ayushman Joshi as a cinematographer, where Joshi said, "Thank you so much Priyanka [Karki] for trusting me on the cinematography front of your project. It has been quite a learning experience for me". Later on 21 July 2019 Karki released series soundtrack titled "Pahaar", the song is performed by New York-based Nepali musician Sajjan Raj Vaidya. Vaidya later stated that he was "Incredibly glad to work together with the wonderful team of Priyanka Karki, Shristi Shrestha, Ayushman DS Joshi and others involved".

Series trailer was released on 1 September 2019, via Karki's official YouTube channel. Upon releasing the trailer Karki made a statement saying, "The series will raise the issue of LGBTQI and their human values", and she further added "The main idea behind developing this series is to address this issue but not as an issue. There are two girls who are possibly in love but it is something new for them". She also announced the series will be eight episodes long for first season, and will release on September 15.

References

External links 

 Official trailer on YouTube

2019 web series debuts
Nepalese television series
2019 Nepalese television series debuts
Nepalese web series